Scaldasole is a comune (municipality) in the Province of Pavia in the Italian region Lombardy, located about 45 km southwest of Milan and about 20 km southwest of Pavia. As of 31 December 2004, it had a population of 902 and an area of 11.6 km².

Scaldasole borders the following municipalities: Dorno, Ferrera Erbognone, Sannazzaro de' Burgondi, Valeggio.

Demographic evolution

References

Cities and towns in Lombardy